Crassispira kluthi is a species of sea snail, a marine gastropod mollusk in the family Pseudomelatomidae.

Description
The length of the shell varies between 10 mm and 20 mm.

This unpretending little species is easily recognized by its black colour and faint sculpture. A row of small tubercles ascends the spire, scarcely discernible on the last whorl, which (as in Crassispira rudis) descends and rises again at the aperture, making the spire-outlines curvilinear. The first three whorls are smooth. The surface shows extremely fine lines of growth, faintly decussated by spiral striae. The outer lip is sharp, not serrated, with a swelling behind. The anterior sinus is very distinct, as in Strombus. The posterior notch is deep. The sutural callosity is large, joining the well-developed inner lip. The operculum is shaped as in Drillia maculosa, with more or less of a reddish tinge. The spire is generally incrusted with blackish mud, sometimes bearing round flat egg-cases, pierced in the middle.

Distribution
This species occurs in the Pacific Ocean off Panama; fossils were found in Pleistocene strata of the Gulf of California.

References

 d' Orbigny, Sagra's Hist. Nat. Cuba, vol. ii. p. 172, pi. xxiii. figs, 29–31,
 Jordan, 1936, Contrib. Dept. Geol. Stanford Univ.  vol. 1, p. 153

External links
 Smith E.A. (1882). Diagnoses of new species of Pleurotomidae in the British Museum. Annals and Magazine of Natural History. ser. 5, 10: 206-218 
 
 
  E.W. Scripps Cruise to the Gulf of California, 1940

kluthi
Gastropods described in 1936